A health campaign is a type of media campaign which attempts to promote public health by making new health interventions available. The organizers of a health campaign frequently use education along with an opportunity to participate further, such as when a vaccination campaign seeks both to educate the public about a vaccine and provide the vaccine to people who want it. When a health campaign has international relevance it may be called a global health campaign.

Examples

Health education
Many diseases and medical problems have a "health education campaign" or "awareness campaign" associated with them. The goal of such a campaign is to make people conscious of the impact of diseases and to provide them information about the disease if they want to learn more about it.

Eradication of infectious diseases

Various health campaigns have taken the goal of eradicating infectious diseases. In such campaigns the organizers recruit the public to participate in the campaign by talking about it with others and encouraging others to participate.

Behavior modification campaign
An organization may organize a campaign which asks for participants to change their behavior in some way. Examples of such projects are smoking cessation campaigns which ask people to quit smoking, HIV prevention campaigns which ask people to do things such as use condoms to reduce HIV infection risk, or exercise campaigns which encourage people to engage in physical activity for health.

Organizations as campaigns
In some cases the work of an organization may itself be a health campaign. This may happen when, for example, an organization exists to provide health information or medical resources to anyone who requests them. The organization itself may conduct a series of health campaigns, and its entire operation may be called a health campaign.

Sources